Tim K, born Timothy John Kvasnosky, is a Los Angeles-based music producer and film composer who was born in Seattle, Washington, United States.

Tim K composed the score (along with collaborator Jake Shears of the Scissor Sisters) to the 2015 Sundance Film Festival select "I Am Michael", starring James Franco. In 2016, he scored "King Cobra" starring Christian Slater and James Franco which documented the real life murder of porn producer Bryan Kocis. As a producer and sideman has also worked with artists such as Sam Sparro, Ed Droste, Jake Shears, Rahzel, Lisa Shaw, Kat DeLuna, Dam Funk, Miguel Migs and DJ Colette.   He is a member of the musical group Tiny Hearts. As a remixer, he produced 4 top 5 Billboard Club Play remixes.  He has also scored commercials for Nike, Target, Corona, Friskies, Volkswagen, Bulgari, Google, McDonald's, and many others.  His Friskies commercial composition "Adventureland" was featured during the 2010 Winter Olympics.

Background
At the age of five, he began classical piano lessons.  At the age of 11, he began playing jazz saxophone.  By high school, he was playing as a jazz pianist sideman in Seattle, and was also the DJ in a local hiphop crew.  He attended NYU jazz performance program with concentration in Piano, where he jammed in his dorm room with Bosco Mann. He studied with Frank Kimbrough, Arturo O'Farrill and Don Friedman.  He has been a keyboard sideman with Sam Sparro, Lisa Shaw, Kat DeLuna, Rahzel, Orchestra Clave, Miguel Migs and DJ Colette.

Film

In 2018, Tim K scored  JT Leroy starring Kristen Stewart and Laura Dern. The film is a biographical drama film that tells the story of Laura Albert, a woman who wrote and published a series of books under the pseudonym JT LeRoy, a young transgender man. The score featured an avant garde small ensemble woodwind score. 

In 2016, Tim K scored King Cobra, starring James Franco, Christian Slater and Molly Ringwald about the death of porn producer Bryan Kocis. It premiered at the Tribeca Film Festival. The score was well received, the music praised as "effervescent electronic score" by Screen Daily.

In 2015, he composed score to Buried Above Ground, a documentary by director Ben Selkow.

In 2014, Tim K composed the score, with Jake Shears of the Scissor Sisters, to  Justin Kelly directed, Gus Van Sant produced I Am Michael starring James Franco and Emma Roberts The film was selected for domestic premiere at the Sundance Film Festival in 2015, and internationally at the Berlin International Film Festival.

Producer/songwriter
Tim K has produced records in variety of electronic music styles, often with jazz influences.

In 2017, he produced Sam Sparro's "Christmas In Blue" EP, which featured some classic carols in a vintage 1960s jazz style production. The independently release EP reached No. 25 on the Billboard Jazz Chart.

He produced and co-released Honey Dijon's debut album Best of Both Worlds, released on Defected Records UK.

He has been a longtime producer and songwriter for DJ Colette, for whom he produced three albums. When writing, he often starts with a melodic keyboard part and builds drums, and vocal melodies around it. Her "Italo-disco-owing" and "indelible electro" album When The Music's Loud, featuring all compositions co-written and many produced by Tim K, was released in September 2013. The album was named by Vice as one of the 99 Greatest Dance Albums of all time. The album was also named as one of Billboard 's Top 20 Dance albums of 2013.

In December 2013, he produced and co-wrote debut single "War Of Hearts" for artist Russell Taylor, helping him win VH1 Artist You Oughta Know award, which he performed live December 2, 2013 on Big Morning Buzz Live.

A longtime vintage recording technique aficionado, using vintage microphones, techniques, tape and James Brown's old mixer, he recorded Shoshana Bean's second album O'Farrell Street in 2012 at North Hollywood. With JT Donaldson, in 2012 Tim K also produced underground hip hop group Hawthorne Headhunter's "Sum People Don't Change" from their debut LP Myriad of Now on Plug Research. Tim K lent a hand to The System's 2012 release for beatmaker David Frank's production "Mother Ungh Ungh", providing some "stutter" style edit of Mic Murphy's vocals.

In 2011, with Fab Dupont Tim K co-produced, played vintage keyboards and added additional production to many of the tracks on Les Nubians' Nu Revolution album.

In 2010, Tim K co-produced Dâm-Funk's Hood Pass Intact's "highlight" track "How It Be Between You and Me" on Stones Throw Records. The album received a favorable Pitchfork rating.  Later in the year, a track he produced, "Stressin'" featuring Kissey was selected for Mark Farina's Mushroom Jazz compilation, volume 7.  Also in 2010, Tim K produced the lead single "Slow Recovery" for Lucy Woodward's Hooked album for Verve Records.

Home & Garden
Tim K worked with DJ/Producer Timothy Shumaker under the moniker Home & Garden starting in 2000.  They released 12" singles and remixes for labels such as Atlantic Records, Reprise Records and Warner Bros. Records.  Their debut full-length record Domesticated was released on Om Records in 2007.  It featured appearances from Derrick Carter, Lisa Shaw, DJ Colette, Lucy Woodward, Chez Damier and Mic Murphy.

Tiny Hearts
Tim K is currently working a collaborative project, Tiny Hearts with producer Waajeed and vocalist Dede Reynolds. Their debut EP Stay will be released on Detroit's Dirt Tech Reck label. Their initial video "Centerfold" was released in September 2013.  A live performance of Tiny Hearts was featured on Boilerroom.tv. His composition for the group, "Snow Cold", was featured on NPR's Here and Now late in 2013.

Commercial and other work
Friskies tapped Tim K to compose music for its "Adventureland" Campaign, featured in the Winter Olympics, as well as in 3D at movie theatre venues across the US. The 9 commercial campaign featured singer Deanne Reynolds of Tiny Hearts.  The commercial was listed as Advertising Age's Ad of the week.  In 2013, Tim K composed the music for Nike's KDV shoe release.

Selected discography and chart performance

References

External links
Tim K Music

Remixers
American dance musicians
American house musicians
Record producers from California
American film score composers
Living people
Musicians from Seattle
American male film score composers
Musicians from Los Angeles
Year of birth missing (living people)